Magnolia Park may refer to one of the following:

Magnolia Park (Wrocław), a shopping mall in Wrocław, Poland
Magnolia Park (Houston), a former city and now section of Houston, Texas, United States
Magnolia Park (Hillsboro, Oregon), a city park in Hillsboro, Oregon, United States
Magnolia Park (Miami), a neighborhood within the City of Miami, Florida, United States
Magnolia Park (Seattle), a park in Seattle, Washington, United States
Magnolia Park (Apopka, Florida), a park in Apopka, Florida, United States
Magnolia Park Town Center, a shopping center in Greenville, South Carolina